Loučka is a municipality and village in Vsetín District in the Zlín Region of the Czech Republic. It has about 800 inhabitants.

Administrative parts
The village of Lázy is an administrative part od Loučka.

References

Villages in Vsetín District